Miguel Castillo Bracho (died 11 May 2017) was a Venezuelan social communicator who was killed during the 2017 Venezuelan protests.

Killing 
On 11 May 2017, Miguel was on the main avenue of Las Mercedes, Baruta municipality, in Caracas, when National Guard officials fired metal spheres, hitting him at the left intercostal.

On 13 July, a night march was summoned in honor of those killed during the protests, including Castillo, marching to the places where the demonstrators died. Dissident CICPC inspector Óscar Pérez made a surprise appearance in the march, before leaving and disappearing.

The killing of Miguel Castillo was documented in a report by a panel of independent experts from the Organization of American States, considering that it could constitute a crime against humanity committed in Venezuela along with other killings during the protests.

See also 

 Armando Cañizales
 Neomar Lander
 Paúl Moreno
 Jairo Ortiz
 Juan Pablo Pernalete
 Neomar Lander
 Paola Ramírez
 Xiomara Scott
 Fabián Urbina
 David Vallenilla
 Timeline of the 2017 Venezuelan protests

References 

Deaths by firearm in Venezuela
Deaths by person in Venezuela
Filmed killings
Male murder victims
People murdered in Venezuela
People shot dead by law enforcement officers
2017 deaths
2017 Venezuelan protests
Victims of police brutality
Year of birth missing
2017 murders in Venezuela